Paradiexia pellita is a species of beetle in the family Cerambycidae, and the only species in the genus Paradiexia. It was described by Heller in 1923.

References

Pteropliini
Beetles described in 1923